Coleman Seamount is a submarine volcano in the western Solomon Islands. The volcano was discovered in 1985 by the Hawaiian "Moana Wave" research vessel.

References

Seamounts of the Pacific Ocean
Volcanoes of the Solomon Islands